The 1976 Grand Prix German Open, also known by its sponsored name Holsten-Bier German Open. was a combined men's and women's tennis tournament played on outdoor red clay courts. It was the 68th edition of the event and was part of the 1976 Commercial Union Assurance Grand Prix circuit. It took place at the Am Rothenbaum in Hamburg, West Germany, from 17 May through 23 May 1976. Eddie Dibbs and Sue Barker won the singles titles.

Finals

Men's singles
 Eddie Dibbs defeated  Manuel Orantes 6–4, 4–6, 6–1, 2–6, 6–1

Women's singles
 Sue Barker defeated  Renáta Tomanová 6–3, 6–1

Men's doubles
 Fred McNair/  Sherwood Stewart defeated  Dick Crealy /  Kim Warwick 7–6, 7–6, 7–6

Women's doubles
 Linky Boshoff /  Ilana Kloss  defeated  Laura DuPont /  Wendy Turnbull 4–6, 7–5, 6–1

References

External links
  
   
 Association of Tennis Professionals (ATP) tournament profile
 International Tennis Federation (ITF) tournament edition details

German Open
Hamburg European Open
1976 in West German sport
1976 in German tennis